Incest is a 1929 German silent film directed by James Bauer and starring Walter Rilla, Erna Morena, and Olga Chekhova.

The film's art direction was supervised by Max Heilbronner.

Cast

References

Bibliography

External links 
 

1929 films
Films of the Weimar Republic
Films directed by James Bauer
German silent feature films
Incest in film
German black-and-white films
1920s German films